Eva Petrovska (born 5 November 2004) is a Macedonian swimmer.

In 2019, she represented North Macedonia at the 2019 World Aquatics Championships held in Gwangju, South Korea. She competed in the women's 800 metre freestyle and women's 1500 metre freestyle events. In both events she did not advance to compete in the final.

References 

Living people
2004 births
Place of birth missing (living people)
Macedonian female swimmers
Macedonian female freestyle swimmers